Kim Da-bin (born August 29, 1989), also known as Kim Dong-wook, is a South Korean football player who plays for J3 League side Oita Trinita.

External links

 

1989 births
Living people
Association football forwards
South Korean footballers
South Korean expatriate footballers
Daejeon Hana Citizen FC players
Ulsan Hyundai FC players
Chungju Hummel FC players
Hwaseong FC players
Oita Trinita players
K League 1 players
K League 2 players
K3 League players
J3 League players
Korea University alumni
South Korean expatriate sportspeople in Japan
Expatriate footballers in Japan